Tono is a ghost town in southwest Washington in the United States. It was a company-owned mining town founded in 1907 by the Washington Union Coal Company, a subsidiary of the Union Pacific Railroad to supply coal for their steam locomotives. The town was named Tono in 1909 by one of the many Japanese railroad workers. Folk etymology states the name is a contraction of "ton of coal".

At its peak in the 1920s Tono had over 1,000 residents, 125 houses, a hotel, a hospital, a general store, and a school.  The town flourished until 1932 when the railroads began switching to diesel locomotives and the Union Pacific sold the mines to the Bucoda Mining Company.  Afterwards the mines operated intermittently while most of the residents moved away.  Many of the vacant houses were sold and moved to nearby communities. By 1950, there were only a few buildings and residents left in Tono.  The last full-time residents of Tono were John and Lempi Hirvela, who moved there in 1923.  The Hirvelas lived in the last surviving home, the former mine superintendent's residence, until 1976.

In 1967 the Pacific Power & Light Company revived operations at the Tono field, now known as the Centralia Coal Mine.  PP&L purchased the property including the town site (and the Hirvela's home) and began strip mining the area to supply coal for the Centralia Power Plant in nearby Lewis County  Mining operations obliterated most of the former town site in the 1980s.  All that remains of Tono are a few overgrown foundations.

Footnotes

External links
Tono at GeoCities
Tono at Ghosttowns.com
experiencewashington.com
University of Washington Libraries

Ghost towns in Washington (state)
Geography of Thurston County, Washington